Richard Faye "Dick" Palmer (August 1, 1930–December 27, 2018) was an American newspaper editor and politician.

Palmer was born in Duluth, Minnesota. He went to the Duluth public schools, Denfeld High School, and to University of Minnesota Duluth. He served in the Minnesota National Air  Guard and was commissioned a captain. His family owned the Duluth Budgeteer News and Palmer wrote articles and editorials for the newspaper. Palmer served in the Minnesota Senate in 1971 and 1972. He was an Independent and a Republican. He died at New Perspective Senior Living in Superior, Wisconsin.

Notes

1930 births
2018 deaths
Politicians from Duluth, Minnesota
Editors of Minnesota newspapers
Minnesota National Guard personnel
University of Minnesota Duluth alumni
Minnesota Independents
Minnesota Republicans
Minnesota state senators